Love is the debut album by the Los Angeles-based rock band Love; released in March 1966 by Elektra Records.

Background
Arthur Lee, who was originally from Memphis, Tennessee, but had lived in Los Angeles since he was five, had been recording since 1963 with his bands, the LAG's and Lee's American Four. He had written and also produced the single "My Diary" for Rosa Lee Brooks in 1964 which featured Jimi Hendrix on guitar. A garage outfit, The Sons Of Adam, which included future Love drummer Michael Stuart, also recorded a Lee composition, "Feathered Fish". However, after viewing a performance by the Byrds, Lee became determined to form a group that joined the newly minted folk-rock sound of the Byrds to his primarily rhythm and blues style. 

Singer, songwriter / guitarist Bryan MacLean,  whom Lee had met when he was working as a roadie for the Byrds, joined the band just before they changed their name from the Grass Roots to Love, spurred by the release of a single by another group called the Grass Roots. 
MacLean had also been playing guitar in bands since about 1963 but picked up music early.  Neighbor Frederick Loewe, of the composers Lerner & Loewe, recognized him as a "melodic genius" at the age of three as he doodled on the piano.
Also joining the band was another Memphis native, lead guitarist Johnny Echols. From L.A. was drummer Don Conka. A short time later, Conka was replaced by Alban "Snoopy" Pfisterer. Love's first bassist, Johnny Fleckenstein, went on to join the Standells in 1967. Fleckenstein was replaced by Ken Forssi (formerly of a post-"Wipe Out" lineup of the Surfaris).

Recording and music
Ten of the album's fourteen tracks were recorded at Sunset Sound Recorders in Hollywood on January 24–27, 1966. The remaining four tracks ("A Message to Pretty", "My Flash on You", "Emotions", and "Mushroom Clouds") come from another, undocumented session during that period.

Love features a mixture of folk rock genre, garage rock, and psychedelic rock. The first rock album issued on then-folk giant Elektra Records, the album begins with the group's radical reworking of the Burt Bacharach-Hal David song "My Little Red Book" and also features "Signed D.C." (allegedly a reference to one-time Love drummer Don Conka), along with the poignant "A Message to Pretty".

Release and reception

The album sold approximately 150,000 copies.

In a retrospective review of the album, Richie Unterberger for AllMusic called it "their hardest-rocking early album and their most Byrds-influenced." He also stated, "Arthur Lee's songwriting muse hadn't fully developed at this stage, and in comparison with their second and third efforts, this is the least striking of the LPs featuring their classic lineup, with some similar-sounding folk-rock compositions and stock riffs."

2001 CD reissue
The 2001 CD reissue presents both monaural and stereophonic mixes of the album, as well as an alternate take of "Signed D.C." and "No. Fourteen", the B-side to the "7 and 7 Is" single.

Legacy
The stark instrumental "Emotions" is used uncredited in Haskell Wexler's  1969 film Medium Cool as a recurring theme.

"My Little Red Book" was featured over the final credits of the movie High Fidelity in 2000, and the Beverly Hills, 90210 episode "Alone at the Top" in 1995.

Track listing

Personnel

Love
Arthur Lee – lead vocals, percussion, harmonica.  Also drums on "Can't Explain", "No Matter What You Do", "Gazing", and "And More".
Johnny Echols – lead guitar
Bryan MacLean – rhythm guitar, vocals.  Lead vocals on "Softly to Me" and "Hey Joe".
Ken Forssi – bass guitar
Alban "Snoopy" Pfisterer – drums

Additional personnel

According to the box set Love Story, the tracks "A Message to Pretty" and "My Flash on You" may feature John Fleckenstein on bass and Don Conka on drums in place of Forssi and Pfisterer, respectively.

Singles
 "My Little Red Book" b/w "A Message to Pretty" (Elektra 45603)
 "No. Fourteen" (from these sessions, B side of "7 & 7 Is" - Elektra 45605)
 "Hey Joe" (B side to rare "¡Que Vida!" single - Elektra 45613)

Release history

References

1966 debut albums
Love (band) albums
Garage rock albums by American artists
Albums produced by Jac Holzman
Albums produced by Mark Abramson
Elektra Records albums
Albums recorded at Sunset Sound Recorders